After We Collided is a 2014 young adult American romance novel written by Anna Todd under her Wattpad name Imaginator1D and published by Gallery Books, an imprint of Simon & Schuster. After We Collided is the second installment of the After novel series.

A film adaptation of the same name was released on October 23, 2020.

Background
Like its predecessor, After We Collided was originally released as fanfiction on Wattpad as the sequel to After, which was titled as After 2.

Plot
After Tessa found out that Hardin played with her feelings, she leaves him and focuses on school and her life. She resorted her relationship with her mother Carol and ex-boyfriend Noah. She even gets a job at VP (Vance Publishing in the first book). Life started being good for Tessa and her new colleague Trevor falls in love with her.

Hardin, on the other hand, is furious and sad at his friends especially Molly because she destroyed his first ever relationship with a girl who liked him.  He is determined to change himself. He fixes his relationship with his father Ken and accepted Landon as brother and friend.

A few days later Tessa, Trevor, Kimberly, and Vance go to Seattle to celebrate book publishing. Tessa gets drunk and started dancing, accidentally kissing a stranger because she imagined him to be Hardin.

Hardin finds Tessa and Trevor in a hotel room and gets mad, later he and Tessa make love.

The next morning, Tessa and Hardin argue about the incident the previous night. Before leaving the hotel room, Hardin tells her that he was sleeping with Molly. Tessa in rage throws objects at him.

At work, Tessa is talking to Trevor, and he asks her if she loves Hardin. Tessa tells him, yes but they are apart because of personal issues.

Three months after her work at VP Tessa pays a visit to her mother. Tessa tells her that she temporarily broke up with Hardin because he started having anger issues. Carol is delighted about the news, but Tessa said that she will not have any boyfriend from now on, Carol agrees and before Tessa leaves, she says to her mother that she loves her.

Two days later while driving to work Tessa gets into a car accident that knocked her unconscious, she is rushed to the hospital for treatment, but doctors couldn’t do anything, so she slipped into a coma. When Hardin hears about that from Landon, he locks himself in his room and breaks into tears, because the love of his life is lying in a hospital bed unmovable.

A year goes by, and Tessa doesn’t get any better. The doctors are worried about her health, at that time Hardin visits her. While he was sitting in a hospital chair, he was holding her hand, reading her a book, and talking to her. In the middle of talking Tessa starts to squeeze his hand. This shocks Hardin who yelled for a doctor, when Doctor Parker asked why he is yelling? Hardin tells her that Tessa just squeezed his hand. Doctor Parker asked him what he was doing? Hardin answered that he was talking to her. Doctor Parker checks her and smiling said that Tessa is making progress because he was with her and that she loves listening to his voice. 

A week goes by, and Hardin is always on Tessa’s side to help her improve her health. One afternoon a miracle happens – Tessa finally wakes up from the coma, but she doesn’t remember the events from a year ago. She asked if Hardin is her boyfriend? Hardin's answer was no. She started crying but Hardin calmed her down. Then Tessa’s phone rang and she asked who is Trevor and why is he calling her?

Outside, Doctor Parker tells him sad news – they ran a test on Tessa and results came back positive, she has permanently lost her memories and has brain damage because of an accident.

Hardin asked if she is going to remember anything?  Doctor Parker said that she is going to remember him, her family, best friend, her work friend, and boss; but unfortunately, she will not remember her male colleagues and other people from the university. On the next day, Tessa is discharged from hospital, and Hardin took her to their old apartment where she is staying.

Tessa started therapy for her limbs. Hardin is always by her side and praises her for good work.

On her workday, Trevor goes to Tessa and asks her why she didn’t answer his calls? Tessa who doesn’t remember him, stays silent. Before Trevor could do something to her, she is saved by Hardin, Vance and Kimberly. Vance fires Trevor from his office and Trevor swore revenge on Hardin. Tessa faints on the spot.

When she wakes up, she sees that she is in the apartment and that she is wearing her night dress. She asked Hardin if he changed her clothes. Hardin’s answer is yes, then he rests with Tessa on the bed.

On New Year's Eve they arrive at frat house party, but loud music scared Tessa; so, Hardin suggested they go somewhere calm. The two run into Zed, Steph and Tristan who knew the situation of Tessa, so they don’t pressure her to remember them. Hardin then asked if Tessa is thirsty? Tessa says yes, so he brings her a glass of water. The five of them are seated on big leather sofa in peaceful living room, but calming atmosphere is disturbed by Molly who loudly announces her arrival. Molly then sees Tessa cuddling into Hardin’s chest and that makes her jealous.

Molly then started tormenting Tessa which put the poor girl in severe panic attack. At one point, Molly emotionally bullies Tessa, who ended up crying badly and running away. Molly laughs hysterically at the scene. Hardin is so angry that he storms out of the living room to find Tessa but before he stomps out, he yelled at Molly.

He finds Tessa on the road, so he takes her home. They visited tattoo parlor where Hardin got new tattoo. On their way home, they run into homeless man which is Tessa’s dad Richard.

Characters
•Tessa "Theresa" Young 19 years old girl second year of collage employee at Vance Publishing and Hardin’s ex-girlfriend.

• Hardin Scott rebellious British boy and Tessa’s ex-boyfriend.

• Carol Young Tessa’s mother who dislikes Hardin.

• Noah Porter Tessa’s ex-boyfriend.

• Trevor Mathews Tessa’s male colleague who like her.

• Ken Scott Hardin’s father and chancellor at Washington Central University.

• Karen Scott Ken’s new wife.

• Landon Gibson Tessa’s best friend, Hardin’s brother, English major.

• Zed Evans Hardin’s best friend Tessa’s love interest.

• Steph Jones edgy red-haired girl, Hardin’s best friend and Tessa’s ex-roommate, Tristan’s girlfriend.

•Molly Samuel's pink mean girl ex friend of Hardin who have on and off relationship with him.

Reception

Adaptations

Film
 
A film adaptation for After We Collided was announced in May 2019. Langford and Fiennes Tiffin reprised their respective roles as Tessa and Hardin, and the film was released on October 23, 2020.

Graphic novel
In July 2021, it was announced that the novel series will be adapted into graphic novels by artist Pablo Andrés.

References

American romance novels
2014 American novels
American young adult novels
Fan fiction works
American novels adapted into films
Gallery Books books